Paulding is a surname. Notable people with the surname include:

John Paulding, noted for his part in the capture of the spy John André
John Paulding (sculptor)  American sculptor (1883 – 1935) 
Hiram Paulding (1797–1878), rear admiral in the U.S. Navy; son of John Paulding
James Kirke Paulding (1778–1860), novelist and U.S. Secretary of the Navy
William Paulding, Jr. (1770–1854), U.S. Representative and Adjutant General for New York and mayor of New York
Nathalie Paulding, theatre, film, and television actress
Rickey Paulding, professional basketball player
Julie Paulding, English cyclist
Steve Paulding, Welsh cyclist; husband of Julie